WMLK (9.275 MHz) is a shortwave radio station in Bethel, Pennsylvania owned by the Assemblies of Yahweh.  WMLK derives its callsign from MLK, representing the consonants of the Hebrew word "malak" (מַלְאָךְ) meaning a "messenger" or angel. A different vocalisation of the word will also yield the definition salt.

History
Radio broadcasts by the Assemblies of Yahweh began in 1966 and they were called the Sacred Name Broadcast. Elder Jacob O. Meyer, the President of the Assemblies of Yahweh at the time, wanted to find a way of completing the Great Commission of  without having to resort to the expensive outreach of using commercial radio stations. After some discussion with the brethren of the Assemblies of Yahweh, they decided that having a radio station of their own would be very advantageous to the ministry. They came to the conclusion that Bethel was strategically placed for sending radio signals throughout the earth, as they could cover much of the earth's landmass from their position.

In 1981, the Assemblies of Yahweh bought a 50,000-watt radio transmitter which was converted into a tool for shortwave broadcasting. From this point onwards, the Assemblies of Yahweh began to build their own radio station in order to "proclaim Yahweh's Truth".   Two prominent members of the Assemblies of Yahweh were hired to work on this project, both in the dismantling and rebuilding of WMLK. One of those individuals was chief engineer Deacon Gary McAvin who, after moving to Bethel with his family has continued to work on the transmitter for more than 40 years.

Shofar
The plans for WMLK's large antenna revealed the shape of a trumpet or shofar'''. These steel posts (once sign posts), hoist the WMLK antennas skyward, standing over a busy Interstate Route 78. The Assemblies of Yahweh believe that this is a fulfilment of the prophecy found in  where it talks about making ‘guide-posts’ toward the highway.

 Meyer took this as symbolising the voice of Yahweh going out in to the world like the blowing of the Shophar in Biblical times. 
The steel posts used to hoist the antenna grid in the air were recycled from sign posts used on the interstate highway. According to Assemblies of Yahweh reports, WMLK has required much sacrificial dedication from the leadership, and is often referred to as the "Messenger of Truth". In 1985 the Federal Communications Commission (FCC) license was granted, and later authorized the station to increase power.

A new transmitter in 2020
The Assemblies of Yahweh have now contracted the same company which built the 250,000-watt BBC transmitter to build a new model which will enable the ministry to broadcast at up to 300,000 watts. Technological advances to the new antenna will mean not only will the audio clarity be improved but the cost to transmit will be much lower also. The Assemblies of Yahweh have prepared a building for the new instrument and so far has been prepared in Switzerland and has been shipped to the shores of the U.S in 2021. The ministry has assembled the transmitter and will be broadcasting beginning June 20, 2022. The Assemblies of Yahweh is hoping to acquire the necessary funds to be able to finance this project.

Sermons
The station has been used for broadcasting sermon and Bible studies across the globe, proclaiming the message of Yahweh: repentance and obedience to the Biblical Law.  According to the SNB magazine (June 1988), the key targeted areas were Europe and the Middle East, but the signal waves are not limited and reach far and wide. At present, audiences from 120 countries have responded.

Other radio stations airing The Sacred Name broadcast

 Current stations 
(December 2019) 

West Indies
 DBS Radio (Dominica) 88.1 FM Radio GBN (Grenada) 535 Guyana Radio Roraima 760 Radio St. Lucia 660 Radio PJD2 (St. Maarten) 1300 Trinidad Radio Power 102.5Eastern
 WWVA 1170 WCKY 1530Central
 KCKM 1330 AM WSM 650 AMWestern
 KDIA 1640 AMPhilippines
 DWNW 756 DXCC 828 DXWG 855Nigeria
Bayelsa State Radio 97.1 FMRivers States Ray Power Radio 105.5 FMAbia State Radio 88.1 FMBenue State Radio 95.0 FMRock City Radio 101.9 FMInvicta Radio, Kaduna 98.9 FM''

See also
Sacred Scriptures Bethel Edition
Jacob O. Meyer
End Times

References

External links
Assemblies of Yahweh official website
Welcome to WMLK Radio
WMLK RADIO STREAMING 
Schedule times and Program Log
DX Club information of Shortwave Broadcasters
News report of WMLK on Alaska News
WMLK Radio via TuneIn.com

MLK
Shortwave radio stations in the United States
Assemblies of Yahweh
Radio stations established in 1981